Kingsley is an electoral district of the Legislative Assembly in the Australian state of Western Australia.

The district is located in the northern suburbs of Perth.

Geography
Located in the northern suburbs of Perth, the district of Kingsley is a north–south elongated electorate bordered by four major roads. It is bounded to the west by the Mitchell Freeway, to the north by Ocean Reef Road, to the east by Wanneroo Road and to the south by Beach Road. The district covers the entirety of five suburbs: Kingsley, Greenwood, Hamersley, Warwick and Woodvale.

History
Kingsley was first created ahead of the 1989 state election and won by Liberal candidate Cheryl Edwardes. Edwardes held the seat until her retirement at the 2005 state election, when her husband Colin Edwardes ran to succeed her as the new Liberal candidate, but was defeated by Labor candidate Judy Hughes. Kingsley was the only seat the Labor Party took from the Liberal Party at the 2005 election.

A redistribution ahead of the 2008 state election mostly wiped out the Labor margin in Kingsley. Accordingly, Hughes was defeated after one term by Liberal candidate Andrea Mitchell. Mitchell was re-elected in 2013, but was defeated in 2017 by Labor candidate Jessica Stojkovski.

Members for Kingsley

Election results

References

External links
 ABC election profiles: 2005 2008
 WAEC district maps: current boundaries, previous distributions

Kingsley